Foundryside is a 2018 fantasy novel by Robert Jackson Bennett. It was first published by Crown Publishing Group on August 21, 2018.

Synopsis
In the city of Tevanne, where "scriving" — the systematization and mass production of sigils — has enabled the industrialization of magic, Sancia Grado is a thief hired to steal a powerful magical artifact... one which has a mind of its own.

Reception
Kirkus Reviews considered it "grand entertainment" (if one can "accept the notion that the laws of gravity are just suggestions"), with Sancia being "a gamin version of the Tom Cruise of Mission Impossible, and police officer Gregor Dandolo "worthy of Umberto Eco".

The Verge described it as "essentially a cyberpunk novel, trapped in the clothes of an epic fantasy", and "pressingly modern and relevant", lauding both the "enthralling heist" and the extent to which Bennett focused on "the ethics of capitalism".

Locus praised Bennett's depiction of "the general mayhem that follows in Sancia’s wake" as "complicated and believable, but never confusing", and called Sancia "an enjoyable protagonist" and "three-dimensional, marked by a massive case of PTSD and an inability to jettison her sense of empathy", but faulted scriving as not only overly complex, but "so interwoven with the politics [of Tevanne] that the first quarter or so of the book has been overtaken by infodumps".

Tor.com commended Bennett for "the central message of Sancia's character arc", and noted that the novel as a whole is "populated with rich, complex people".

References

2018 American novels
American fantasy novels
Crown Publishing Group books